Elementalz, is the debut album by British hip hop group The Brotherhood. it was released on January 9, 1996, through Virgin.

Track listing
 One - 5:17
 Alphabetical Response - 5:23
 Nothing In Particular - 4:21
 Mad Headz - 5:22
 On The Move - 4:53
 Goin' Undaground - 6:29 
 Punk Funk - 4:14
 You Gotta Life - 4:37
 One Shot - 4:29
 Incredible - 5:28
 Clunk Click - 5:29
 Nominate - 5:02
 Dark Stalkers - 4:38
 British Accent - 4:30
 Pride (Revisited) - 5:40

Samples
"One"
"Starless" by King Crimson
"Is It Him or Me" by Jackie Jackson
"Nothing In Particular"
"Constant Elevation" by Gravediggaz
"Mad Headz"
"Why Can't People Be Colors Too?" by The Whatnauts
"Dancing In Outer Space" by Atmosfear
"Song for Chicago" by Malcolm McLaren
"Goin' Undaground"
"Light My Fire" by Brian Auger's Oblivion Express
"You Gotta Life"
"Get Out of My Life, Woman" by Iron Butterfly
"Brooklyn Battles" by Masta Ace
"One Shot"
"Mysterious Vibes" by Sunburst
"Incredible"
"It's A New Day" by Skull Snaps
"How Many MC's" by Black Moon
"Clunk Click"
"Moon in June" by Soft Machine
"British Accent"
"Funky Rhymes, Funky Styles" by PD3

References

 http://www.discogs.com/Brotherhood-Elementalz/release/262151
 http://www.allmusic.com/album/elementalz-mw0001036638

1996 debut albums
Virgin Records albums
The Brotherhood (rap group) albums